The list of Ash'aris and Maturidis includes prominent adherents of the Ash'ari and Maturidi schools of thought. The Ash'aris are a doctrinal school of thought named after Imam Abu al-Hasan al-Ash'ari, and the Maturidi school is named for Abu Mansur al-Maturidi. Both belong to the school of kalam. European scholars generally hold that both schools are essentially the same, deriving from the examination of a work called Ar-rawda al-bahiyya fi-ma bayn al-Asha'ira wa-l Maturidiyya, stating that the schools would "differ in only thirteen points". A similar conclusion was made by Mehmed Esad Efendi (1684–1753). This conclusion was generally accepted by Western scholars for a long time, such as Goldziher and Wilhelm Spitta. Contrarily, contemporary scholarship argue that the differences are too significant to be ignored.

Both Imam al-Ash'ari and Imam al-Maturidi were Sunni Muslims who lived during the time of the first three centuries after the time of the Prophetic revelation. In Sunni Islam it is understood that the earliest scholars held the most weight with terms to encapsulating the religion as was intended by the Islamic prophet Muhammad. Both of them defended and upheld the transmitted beliefs of the Qur'an and Sunnah, as understood by mainstream Sunni Islam in each generation before them, from the extremes of excessive literalism.

Their teachings and methodology were accepted as the standard of mainstream Sunni Islam by clear general consensus of the scholarly community in their own times and in every generation since. The Malikis and Shafi'is, on the whole, became Ash'aris in theology, while majority of the Hanafis became Maturidis (who in many respects are similar to Ash'aris).

Ash'aris 

Ash'aris are those who adhere to Imam Abu al-Hasan al-Ash'ari in his school of theology.

Ibn 'Abd al-Salam said: "Agreement has formed in subscribing to al-Ash'ari's doctrine among the Shafi'is, the Malikis, the Hanafis, and the nobility of the Hanbalis." His statement was endorsed in his time by the Maliki authority Abu 'Amr ibn al-Hajib and by the Shaykh of the Hanafis Jamal al-Din al-Hasiri. The Maliki imam Abu 'Abd Allah Muhammad ibn Musa al-Mayurqi said: "The Ahl al-Sunna among the Malikis, the Shafi'is, and the majority of the Hanafis speak with the tongue of Abu al-Hasan al-Ash'ari and argue by his arguments." Taj al-Din al-Subki quoted it and went on to say: "We do not know any Malikis except they are Ash'aris."

There are some rare exceptions, such as Ibn 'Abd al-Barr and Abu 'Umar al-Talamnaki. As for Ibn Abi Zayd al-Qayrawani (310-386), he belonged to the Ash'ari school which he took, among others, from Abu Bakr ibn 'Abd al-Mu'min the student of Ibn Mujahid the student of Abu al-Hasan al-Ash'ari. Al-Qadi 'Iyad mentioned that in the year 368 Ibn Abi Zayd sent two of his students to deliver some of his books by hand to Ibn Mujahid who had requested them, with a full license to narrate them from him (ijaza). Ibn Abi Zayd notably defended the Ash'ari school in his epistle entitled "Al-Radd 'ala al-Qadariyya wa Munaqadat Risalet al-Baghdadi al-Mu'tazili," a refutation of the attacks of the Mu'tazili 'Ali ibn Isma'il al-Baghdadi. Al-Mayurqi further narrated that Ibn Abi Zayd said: "Al-Ash'ari is a man famous for refuting the people of Innovation, the Qadariyya and the Jahmiyya, and he held fast to the Sunan."

Ibn 'Asakir in his "Tabyin Kadhib al-Muftari fima Nusiba ila al-Imam Abi al-Hasan al-Ash'ari", and Taj al-Din al-Subki in his "Tabaqat al-Shafi'iyya al-Kubra" listed the most illustrious figures of the Ash'ari scholars, starting with the biographical layer of al-Ash'ari himself.

Malikis 
 Ibn Abi Zayd al-Qayrawani (d. 386 AH)
 Al-Baqillani (d. 403 AH)
 Abu Imran al-Fasi (d. 430 AH)
 Abu Dharr al-Harawi (d. 434 AH)
 Ibn Sidah (d. 458 AH)
 Abu al-Walid al-Baji (d. 474 AH)
 Abu Bakr al-Turtushi (d. 520 AH)
 Al-Maziri (d. 536 AH)
 Ibn Barrajan (d. 536 AH)
 Abu Bakr ibn al-Arabi (d. 543 AH)
 Al-Qadi 'Ayyad (d. 544 AH)
 Al-Suhayli (d. 581 AH)
 Ibn al-Qattan (d. 628 AH)
 Ibn Malik (d. 672 AH)
 Shihab al-Din al-Qarafi (d. 684 AH)
 Ibn Daqiq al-'Id (d. 702 AH)
 Ibn 'Ata' Allah al-Iskandari (d. 709 AH)
 Ibn Adjurrum (d. 723 AH)
 Ibn al-Hajj al-'Abdari (d. 737 AH)
 Ibn Juzayy (d. 741 AH)
 Khalil ibn Ishaq al-Jundi (d. 776 AH)
 Abu Ishaq al-Shatibi (d. 790 AH)
 Ibn 'Arafa (d. 803 AH)
 Ibn Khaldun (d. 808 AH)
 Abd al-Rahman al-Tha'alibi (d. 876 AH)
 Ahmad Zarruq (d. 899 AH)
 Ahmad al-Wansharisi (d. 914 AH)
 Al-Akhdari (d. 953 AH)
 Al-Hattab (d. 954 AH)
 Ahmad Baba al-Timbukti (d. 1036 AH)
 Al-Maqqari al-Tilimsani (d. 1041 AH)
 Ibrahim al-Laqani (d. 1041 AH)
 Muhammad Mayyara (d. 1072 AH)
 Ibn 'Ashir (d. 1090 AH)
 Al-Hasan al-Yusi (d. 1102 AH)
 Muhammad al-Zurqani (d. 1122 AH)
 Ahmad al-Dardir (d. 1201 AH)
 Ahmad ibn 'Ajiba (d. 1224 AH)
 Ahmad al-Tijani (d. 1230 AH)
 Muhammad Arafa al-Desouki (d. 1230 AH)
 Muhammad al-'Arabi al-Darqawi (d. 1239 AH)
 Muhammad ibn 'Ali al-Sanusi (d. 1276 AH)
 Muhammad 'Ilish (d. 1299 AH)
 Ahmad al-Ghumari (d. 1380 AH)
 Muhammad al-'Arabi al-Tabbani (d. 1390 AH)
 Muhammad al-Tahir ibn 'Ashur (d. 1393 AH)
 Abdel-Halim Mahmoud (d. 1397 AH)
 'Abdullah al-Ghumari (d. 1413 AH)
 Muhammad Metwalli al-Sha'rawi (d. 1419 AH)
 Muhammad 'Alawi al-Maliki (d. 1425 AH)
 Ahmad al-Tayyeb
 Ahmad Karima
 Hamza Yusuf
 Muhammad al-Yaqoubi
 Ahmed Saad Al-Azhari

Shafi'is 
 Ibn Hibban (d. 354 AH)
 Ibn Khafif (d. 371 AH)
 Al-Daraqutni (d. 385 AH)
 Al-Khattabi (d. 388 AH)
 Al-Halimi (d. 403 AH)
 Al-Hakim al-Nishapuri (d. 405 AH)
 Ibn Furak (d. 406 AH)
 Muhammad Bin Husayn al-Sulami (d. 414 AH)
 Abu Ishaq al-Isfarayini (d. 418 AH)
 Al-Tha'labi (d. 427 AH)
 Abu Nu'aym al-Isfahani (d.430 AH)
 Abu Muhammad al-Juwayni (d. 438 AH)
 Abu Uthman al-Sabuni (d. 449 AH)
 Al-Bayhaqi (d. 458 AH)
 Al-Khatib al-Baghdadi (d. 463 AH)
 Al-Qushayri (d. 465 AH)
 Abd al-Qahir al-Jurjani (d. 471 AH)
 Abu Ishaq al-Shirazi (d. 476 AH)
 Al-Juwayni (d. 478 AH)
 Al-Raghib al-Isfahani (d. 502 AH)
 Al-Ghazali (d. 505 AH)
 Al-Shahrastani (d. 548 AH)
 Ibn 'Asakir (d. 571 AH)
 Ahmad al-Rifa'i (d. 578 AH)
 Fakhr al-Din al-Razi (d. 606 AH)
 Ibn al-Athir (d. 630 AH)
 Ibn al-Salah (d. 643 AH)
 Ibn al-Najjar (d. 643 AH)
 Izz al-Din ibn 'Abd al-Salam (d. 660 AH)
 Al-Nawawi (d. 676 AH)
 Ibn Khallikan (d. 681 AH)
 Al-Baydawi (d. 685 AH)
 Ibn Daqiq al-'Id (d. 702 AH)
 Safi al-Din al-Hindi (d. 715 AH)
 Nizam al-Din al-Nisapuri (d. 728 AH)
 Taqi al-Din al-Subki (d. 756 AH)
 Al-Safadi (d. 764 AH)
 Taj al-Din al-Subki (d. 771 AH)
 Jamal al-Din al-Isnawi (d. 772 AH)
 Shams al-Din al-Kirmani (d. 786 AH)
 Al-Zarkashi (d. 794 AH)
 Ibn al-Mulaqqin (d. 804 AH)
 Siraj al-Din al-Bulqini (d. 805 AH)
 Zain al-Din al-'Iraqi (d. 806 AH)
 Nur al-Din al-Haythami (d. 807 AH)
 Ibn al-Jazari (d. 833 AH)
 Ibn Hajar al-Asqalani (d. 852 AH)
 Al-Sakhawi (d. 902 AH)
 Al-Suyuti (d. 911 AH)
 Nur al-Din al-Samhudi (d. 911 AH)
 Jalal al-Din al-Dawani (d. 918 AH)
 Al-Qastallani (d. 923 AH)
 Zakariyya al-Ansari (d. 926 AH)
 Al-Sha'rani (d. 973 AH)
 Ibn Hajar al-Haytami (d. 974 AH)
 Al-Khatib al-Shirbini (d. 977 AH)
 Al-Munawi (d. 1031 AH)
 'Abdallah ibn 'Alawi al-Haddad (d. 1132 AH)
 Hasan al-Attar (d. 1230 AH)
 Ahmad Zayni Dahlan (d. 1304 AH)
 Bediuzzaman Said Nursi (d. 1379 AH)
 Ahmad Kaftaru (d. 1425 AH)
 Noah al-Qudah (d. 1432 AH)
 'Abdallah al-Harari (d. 1432 AH)
 Muhammad Said Ramadan al-Bouti (d. 1434 AH)
 Ahmad Badreddin Hassoun
 Ali Gomaa
 Ali al-Jifri
 Umar bin Hafiz
 Gibril Fouad Haddad
 Nuh Ha Mim Keller
 Sa'id Foudah

Hanbalis 
 Ibn 'Aqil (d. 508 AH)
 Ibn al-Jawzi (d. 534 AH)
 Al-Bahuti (d. 537 AH)

Zahiris 
 Ibn Tumart (d. 524 AH)
 Ibn Mada' (d. 592 AH)
 Abu Hayyan al-Andalusi (d. 745 AH)

Hanafi 
Some of the Hanafis follow the Ash'ari school of thought, such as:
 Al-Taftazani (d. 792 AH)
 Shah Waliullah Dehlawi (d. 1176 AH)

Ash'ari leaders 
 Nizam al-Mulk (d. 485 AH)
 Yusuf ibn Tashfin (d. 500 AH)
 'Abd al-Mu'min ibn 'Ali (d. 558 AH)
 Saladin (d. 589 AH)
 Abu Bakr ibn Ayyub (d. 615 AH)
 Al-Kamil (d. 635 AH)
 Al-Ashraf Musa (d. 635 AH)
 Qutuz (d. 658 AH)
 Al-Nasir ibn Qalawun (d. 741 AH)
 Emir Abdelkader al-Jazairi (d. 1300 AH)
 Omar al-Mukhtar (d. 1350 AH)
 Ibn Abdelkarim al-Khattabi (d. 1382 AH)
 Al-Muwahhidun
 Ayyubid dynasty

Maturidis 

Abu Mansur al-Maturidi, who was a leading theologian and jurist of his time in Transoxiana (Ma Wara' al-Nahr) in Central Asia, was the founder of the Maturidiyya theological school. This was one of the two principal Sunni schools of kalam, or Islamic theology. Unlike Ash'arism, Maturidite theology has generally remained associated exclusively with only one Sunni madhhab, that of Abu Hanifa.

Hanafi
 Al-Hakim al-Samarqandi (d. 342 AH)
 Abu Bakr al-Kalabadhi (d. 379 AH)
 Abu al-Layth al-Samarqandi (d. 375 AH)
 Abu Zayd al-Dabusi (d. 429 AH)
 Ali Hujwiri (d. 464 AH)
 Yūsuf Balasaguni (d. 469 AH)
 Abu al-Yusr al-Bazdawi (d. 493 AH)
 Abu al-Mu'in al-Nasafi (d. 508 AH)
 Abu Ishaq al-Saffar al-Bukhari (d. 534 AH)
 Yusuf Hamadani (d. 535 AH)
 Sheikh Ahmad-e Jami (d. 536 AH)
 Najm al-Din 'Umar al-Nasafi (d. 537 AH)
 Ahmad Yasawi (d. 561 AH)
 Siraj al-Din al-Ushi (d. 575 AH)
 Nur al-Din al-Sabuni (d. 580 AH)
 Fatima al-Samarqandi (d. 581 AH)
 Al-Kasani (d. 587 AH)
 Jamal al-Din al-Ghaznawi (d. 593 AH)
 Abu al-Thana' al-Lamishi (d. beginning of the sixth century AH)
 Al-Mu'azzam 'Isa (d. 624 AH)
 Qutbuddin Bakhtiar Kaki (d. 632 AH)
 Mu'in al-Din Chishti (d. 633 AH)
 Saif ed-Din al-Boharsi (d. 659 AH)
 Fariduddin Ganjshakar (d. 664 AH)
 Rumi (d. 671 AH)
 Shams al-Din al-Samarqandi (d. after 690 AH)
 Abu al-Barakat al-Nasafi (d. 710 AH)
 Sultan Walad (d. 711 AH)
 Nizamuddin Auliya (d. 725 AH)
 Sadr al-Shari'a al-Asghar (d. 747 AH)
 Akmal al-Din al-Babarti (d. 786 AH)
 Baha' al-Din Naqshband (d. 791 AH)
 Kadi Burhan al-Din (d. 800 AH)
 Al-Sharif al-Jurjani (d. 816 AH)
 Bande Nawaz (d. 825 AH)
 Shams al-Din al-Fanari (d. 834 AH)
 'Ala' al-Din al-Bukhari (d. 841 AH)
 Yaqub al-Charkhi (d. 851 AH)
 Ahmad ibn Arabshah (d. 861 AH)
 Badr al-Din al-'Ayni (d. 855 AH)
 Al-Kamal ibn al-Humam (d. 861 AH)
 Khidr Bey (d. 863 AH)
 Ali al-Bistami (d. 874 AH)
 'Ali al-Qushji (d. 879 AH)
 Khwaja Ahrar (d. 895 AH)
 Ali-Shir Nava'i (d. 906 AH)
 Husayn Kashifi (d. 910 AH)
 Ibn Kemal (d. 940 AH)
 Abdul Quddus Gangohi (d. 943 AH)
 Ibrahim al-Halabi (d. 955 AH)
 Taşköprüzade (d. 968 AH)
 Muhammad Birgivi (d. 980 AH)
 Ebussuud Efendi (d. 982 AH)
 Khwaja Baqi Billah (d. 1011 AH)
 'Ali al-Qari (d. 1014 AH)
 Hasan Kafi al-Aqhisari (d. 1025 AH)
 Ahmad Sirhindi (d. 1034 AH)
 Mahmud Hudayi (d. 1037 AH)
 'Abd al-Haqq al-Dehlawi (d. 1052 AH)
 Mulla Mahmud Jaunpuri (d. 1061 AH)
 'Abd al-Hakim al-Siyalkoti (d. 1067 AH)
 Wang Daiyu (d. around 1068 AH)
 Kâtip Çelebi (d. 1068 AH)
 Shihab al-Din al-Khafaji (d. 1069 AH)
 Khayr al-Din al-Ramli (d. 1081 AH)
 Ma Zhu (d. around 1123 AH)
 Ismail Haqqi Bursevi (d. 1127 AH)
 Shah Abdur Rahim (d. 1131 AH)
 Liu Zhi of Nanjing (d. 1158 AH, or 1178 AH)
 Nizamuddin Sihalivi (d. 1161 AH)
 Makhdoom Muhammad Hashim Thattvi (d. 1174 AH)
 'Abd al-Ghani al-Nabulsi (d. 1176 AH)
 İbrahim Hakkı Erzurumi (d. 1193 AH)
 Mirza Mazhar Jan-e-Janaan (d. 1195 AH)
 Gelenbevi Ismail Efendi (d. 1204 AH)
 Murtada al-Zabidi (d. 1205 AH)
 Qadi Thanaullah Panipati (d. 1225 AH)
 Ghabdennasir Qursawi (d. 1226 AH)
 Ghulam Ali Dehlavi (d. 1239 AH)
 Shah Abdul Aziz (d. 1239 AH)
 Syed Ahmad Barelvi (d. 1246 AH)
 Ibn 'Abidin (d. 1252 AH)
 Muhammad 'Abid al-Sindi (d. 1257 AH)
 Mamluk Ali Nanautawi (d. 1267 AH)
 Fazl-e-Haq Khairabadi (d. 1278 AH)
 Yusuf Ma Dexin (d. 1291 AH)
 Muhammad Qasim Nanautavi (d. 1297 AH)
 Naqi Ali Khan (d. 1297 AH)
 'Abd al-Ghani al-Maydani (d. 1298 AH)
 'Abd al-Hayy al-Lucknawi (d. 1304 AH)
 Shihab al-Din al-Marjani (d. 1306 AH)
 Rahmatullah al-Kairanawi (d. 1308 AH)
 Giritli Sırrı Pasha (d. 1312 AH)
 Ahmed Cevdet Pasha (d. 1312 AH)
 Imdadullah Muhajir Makki (d. 1317 AH)
 Abai Qunanbaiuly (d. 1321 AH)
 Rashid Ahmad Gangohi (d. 1322 AH)
 Ahmad Hasan Amrohi (d. 1330 AH)
 Muhammad Anwaarullah Farooqui (d. 1335 AH)
 Mahmud Hasan Deobandi (d. 1338 AH)
 Ahmed Raza Khan (d. 1340 AH)
 Shakarim Qudayberdiuli (d. 1344 AH)
 Muhammad Ali Mungeri (d. 1346 AH)
 Khalil Ahmad Saharanpuri (d. 1346 AH)
 Anwar Shah Kashmiri (d. 1352 AH)
 Muhammad Bakhit al-Muti'i (d. 1354 AH)
 Fatma Aliye Topuz (d. 1354 AH)
 Meher Ali Shah (d. 1356 AH)
 Muhammed Hamdi Yazır (d. 1361 AH)
 Ashraf Ali Thanwi (d. 1361 AH)
 Hamid Raza Khan (d. 1361 AH)
 Ubaidullah Sindhi (d. 1364 AH)
 Amjad Ali Aazmi (d. 1367)
 Jamaat Ali Shah (d. 1951 CE)
 Naeem-ud-Deen Muradabadi (d. 1367 AH)
 Shabbir Ahmad Usmani (d. 1368 AH)
 Musa Bigiev (d. 1368 AH)
 Muhammad Zahid al-Kawthari (d. 1371 AH)
 Kifayatullah Dehlawi (d. 1371 AH)
 Mustafa Sabri (d. 1373 AH)
 Süleyman Hilmi Tunahan (d. 1378 AH)
 Sardar Ahmad Chishti (d. 1382 AH)
 Mohammad Abdul Ghafoor Hazarvi (d. 1390 AH)
 Abdul Hamid Qadri Badayuni (d. 1390 AH)
 Ömer Nasuhi Bilmen (d. 1391 AH)
 Muhammad Abu Zahra (d. 1394 AH)
 Abdul Majid Daryabadi (d. 1397 AH)
 Muhammad Shafi' Deobandi (d. 1395 AH)
 Abul Wafa Al Afghani (d. 1395 AH)
 Muhammad Shafi' Deobandi (d. 1395 AH)
 Muhammad Zakariyya al-Kandhlawi (d. 1402 AH)
 Mustafa Raza Khan (d. 1402 AH)
 Muhammad Tayyib Qasmi (d. 1403 AH)
 Muhammad Muslehuddin Siddiqui (d. 1403 AH)
 Habib al-Rahman al-'Azmi (d. 1412 AH)
 Muhammad Waqaruddin Qadri (d. 1414 AH)
 Muhammad Ayyub Ali (d. 1415 AH)
 Anzar Shah Kashmiri (d. 1428 AH)
 Muhammad Karam Shah al-Azhari (d. 1418 AH)
 Arshadul Qadri (d. 1423 AH)
 Shah Ahmad Noorani (d. 1423 AH)
 Abdul Latif Chowdhury Fultali (d. 1429 AH)
 Wahbah al-Zuhayli (d. 1436 AH)
 Akhtar Raza Khan (d. 1439)
 Muhammad Salim Qasmi (d. 1439 AH)
 Saeed Ahmad Palanpuri (d. 1441 AH)
 Khadim Hussain Rizvi (d. 1442 AH)
 Muhammad Rafi' Usmani (d. 1443 AH)
 Abdur Rahman Chatgami
 Muhammad Tahir-ul-Qadri
 Muhammad Taqi Usmani
 Ziaul Mustafa Razvi Qadri
 Muhammad Ilyas Qadri
 Asjad Raza Khan
 Sultan Zauq Nadvi
 A F M Khalid Hossain
 Muzaffar Shah Qadri
 Raza Saqib Mustafai
 Junaid Babunagari
 Kaukab Noorani Okarvi 
 Husein Kavazović
 Salah Mezhiev
 Amer Jamil

Shafi'is
 Muhammad bin Yahya al-Ninowy

Maturidi leaders 
 Seljuq dynasty
 Ottoman dynasty
 Timurid dynasty
 Mughal dynasty
 Alp Arslan (d. 465 AH)
 Nur al-Din Zengi (d. 569 AH)
 Al-Mu'azzam 'Isa (d. 624 AH)
 Mehmed the Conqueror (d. 886 AH)
 Aurangzeb (d. 1118 AH)
 Ottoman sultans

See also 
 List of Muslim theologians
 List of Sufis
 2016 international conference on Sunni Islam in Grozny

References

External links 
 The Ash'aris & Maturidis: Standards of Mainstream Sunni Beliefs
 Differences between the Ash'aris & Maturidis

 
Maturidis
Ash'aris and Maturidis
Sunni Muslims